The G. L. Stocker Blacksmith Shop, in Gettysburg, South Dakota, was built in 1901.  It was listed on the National Register of Historic Places in 1996.

It is located on Main St., two blocks south of U.S. Route 212.  It has false front architecture.  It has a main  section and a  addition to the rear.

It was built in 1901 for the Gettysburg chapter of the Women's Relief Corps (W.R.C.), a women's auxiliary organization to the Grand Army of the Republic (G.A.R.), and was known as Meade W.R.C. Hall.  Meade Post No. 32 of the G.A.R. was established in Gettysburg in 1883.

It was bought in 1920 by George L. Stocker.

References

Blacksmith shops		
National Register of Historic Places in Potter County, South Dakota
Buildings and structures completed in 1901